Canedo Futebol Clube, commonly known as Canedo is a Portuguese football club from Canedo, Santa Maria da Feira. Founded in 1984, the club currently plays at the Campo das Valadas which holds a capacity of 5,000.

The club currently plays in the AF Aveiro Second Division, following relegation in the 2012–13 season from the AF Aveiro First Division. The club is currently sponsored by English sportswear manufacturer Umbro.

Honours
AF Aveiro Cup
 Winners (1): 2000–01
AF Aveiro First Division
 Winners (1): 1990–91

References

External links
 Official site
 Profile at ZeroZero
 Profile at ForaDeJogo

Football clubs in Portugal
Sport in Santa Maria da Feira
Association football clubs established in 1984
1984 establishments in Portugal